Turatia striatula is a moth in the family Autostichidae. It was described by László Anthony Gozmány in 2000. It is found in Saudi Arabia and Yemen.

References

Moths described in 2000
Turatia